Yoon Hyun-Kyung (born June 22, 1986) is a Korean team handball player. She plays on the South Korean national team, and participated at the 2011 World Women's Handball Championship in Brazil.

References

1986 births
Living people
South Korean female handball players
Asian Games medalists in handball
Handball players at the 2006 Asian Games
Handball players at the 2010 Asian Games
Asian Games gold medalists for South Korea
Asian Games bronze medalists for South Korea
Medalists at the 2006 Asian Games
Medalists at the 2010 Asian Games
20th-century South Korean women